Alex Kid may refer to:

 Alex da Kid (born 1982), British hip hop music producer
 Alex Kidd, a Sega video game character
 Kid Alex, a stage name of Boys Noize, a German electronic music producer and DJ